Louie James Clarkson is an English professional footballer who plays as a midfielder for  club Rochdale.

Career
Having joined Rochdale's youth team in 2019, he made his first team debut for Rochdale on 12 November 2019, coming on as an 80th minute substitute for Lewis Bradley in a 2–1 EFL Trophy victory away to Bradford City.

Career statistics

References

External links
 
 
 

Year of birth missing (living people)
English footballers
Association football midfielders
Rochdale A.F.C. players
Living people